Country code: +353
International call prefix: 00
Trunk prefix: 0

This is a list of telephone dialling codes for Ireland. Fixed-line telephone users do not need to dial the dialling code when they are contacting someone else within their own area.

Geographic codes
Irish geographic codes generally correspond to the areas in the list below. Some exceptions and overlap may apply, as the codes reflect the evolution & technical history of the telephone network, rather than exact geographical county & town boundaries.

Dublin area (01)

Cork area (02)

East, Midlands and Northern area (04)

Midlands and Southeast area (05)

Southwest area (06)

Northwest area (07)

Western area (09)

Mobile codes

Mobile network operators (MNOs)

Mobile virtual network operators (MVNOs)

M2M (Machine to Machine) Communication

Reserved Numbers

Special numbers

These codes, unlike most of the above, cannot be dialled from abroad.
The following are special numbers dialled by themselves:

The following codes begin special phone numbers:

The following prefix regular phone numbers in order to affect how they are handled:

Legacy, Historic and Obsolete codes

Historical Great Britain access codes (Discontinued in 1993)

See also
Telephone numbers in the Republic of Ireland

References

ITU allocations list

Ireland
 
Dialling codes